Allen Gregory is an American adult animated sitcom created by Jonah Hill, Jarrad Paul, and Andrew Mogul for Fox. The series follows pretentious seven-year-old Allen Gregory De Longpre, who is raised by his two rich gay fathers, Richard and Jeremy.  The series received negative reviews from critics, who criticized the characters and acting. On January 8, 2012, the series was cancelled after one season.

Synopsis
The series follows Allen Gregory De Longpre (Jonah Hill), a pretentious seven-year-old raised by his two fathers, Richard and Jeremy. Allen has an adopted sister, Julie. Allen must start attending a public elementary school due to the effect of the recession on his family's finances. Richard also pressures Jeremy to secure employment due to the financial issues, although Richard avoids divulging information to Jeremy as to why they need additional income. Allen is enamored with an elderly school principal, Judith Gottlieb, much to her disapproval. She protests but is forced to accept his behavior due to pressure from the school superintendent, who is friends with Richard.

Cast

 Jonah Hill as Allen Gregory De Longpre, a precocious, pretentious, selfish, and spoiled seven-year-old who is forced to attend elementary school due to the recession.
 French Stewart as Richard De Longpre, Allen's gay (and sometimes charismatic) father. Richard is the so-called "Super CEO" of De Longpre International, but it turns out to be a fake title his father made up because his son is not capable of running the company. Richard is given fake jobs to be kept busy. Like Allen, Richard's views on the world are warped.
 Nat Faxon as Jeremy De Longpre, Richard's husband. Jeremy is a former social worker who had a loving wife and family, although this changed after Richard became one of his clients. Richard was attracted to Jeremy to the point where he started stalking him and his family until Jeremy finally agreed to be his husband. It is said that Jeremy is actually heterosexual but abandoned his wife and children for Richard, who offered him an easy, no-maintenance life as his trophy husband. He is a nice guy and a bit of a pushover, and receives little to no respect from Allen or Richard. However, Allen did thank him at one point for his advice. 
 Joy Osmanski as Julie De Longpre, Allen's adopted Cambodian sister. Similar to Jeremy, Julie is constantly abused by both Allen and Richard.
 Cristina Pucelli as Patrick, a student who is Allen's best friend/assistant. He is one of the only kids at school who hangs out with Allen. When Patrick says something, Allen often does not listen unless it plays to his ego.
 Will Forte as Stewart Rossmyre, the school superintendent. He understands Allen's mistakes, and often tries to date Allen's first-grade teacher.

Supporting cast
 Renée Taylor as elderly school principal Judith Gottlieb. Allen is in love with Judith and persistently tries to win her attention, but Judith makes it very clear that she is not interested in a romantic relationship with the child. She once conspired with Julie to get him expelled. Judith is straightforward and has a serious, no-nonsense demeanor. She is in a long-term romantic relationship with Sidney, the school's counselor. They live together and have recently celebrated their 65th anniversary. Sidney has made comments about getting married which she has blown off, though she has referred to their relationship as marriage to herself.
 Leslie Mann as Gina Winthrop, a first-grade teacher who has Allen in her class. She tries to teach Allen, but he continually disrupts the class and shows little to no respect for her or her job.
 Keith David as Carl Trent D'Avis aka Cole Train, an elderly African-American man whom Allen comes to when he has a problem, although Carl does not always give the best advice. He has shown violent and destructive tendencies, such as by attacking an unsuspecting diner manager and setting a records hall on fire in the same day.
 Lacey Chabert as Beth. She is one of Julie's best friends and wears a back brace.
 Nasim Pedrad as Val, another of Julie's best friends. She is of Indian descent and is obese.
 Jake Johnson as Joel Zadak, a popular kid at school. Allen tries hard to impress Joel but is mostly made fun of and picked on in return.
 Will Forte as Ian, one of Allen's classmates. He is often picked on by Joel and the other students because his mom is dead.
 Jonah Hill as Guillermo, an overweight Latino kid who is a sidekick of Joel.

Guest voices
 Lisa Kudrow as Sheila. She appeared in the episode "Mom Sizemore", in which Allen thought she was his biological mother. Allen brought her to live with him and Richard, which forced Jeremy to move out. When she started to get strict with him, Allen realized there was nothing wrong with Jeremy, so he got him back and she left. Later, Allen finds out that Carl just pulled a random file and that he still does not know who his real mother is.
 Jeff Goldblum as Perry Van Moon, Richard's long-time rival.

Episodes

Production
The series was a co-production of 20th Century Fox Television and Chernin Entertainment. Jonah Hill co-created the series with Andrew Mogel and Jarrad Paul. All three, along with Peter Chernin and Katherine Pope, served as executive producers. David A. Goodman, who was with the series Family Guy until its ninth season after its 2005 return to television, was the showrunner and a further executive producer.

Fox placed an order for seven episodes in October 2010. On July 12, 2011, Fox ordered six additional scripts of the series. As of 2011, there had been no further report regarding completion of the scripts, or of any work to shoot the scripts to create further episodes.

Reception
Allen Gregory received negative reviews from critics.  Chris Swanson of WhatCulture gave the pilot episode a rating of 0.5 out of 5, saying "There is nothing charming, witty or interesting about this show. It's just one horribly stupid, cringe-inducing moment after another with characters who are truly loathsome and unpleasant." Robert Bianco of USA Today also gave the show a negative review, saying it was "nasty and brutish", "rarely funny", and made them "hate every character except Julie". Metacritic gave the show an overall review of 40 out of 100.

Broadcast
Allen Gregory aired on Global in Canada, simsubbed in most regions. In the UK, it was shown on E4.

References

External links
 

2011 American television series debuts
2011 American television series endings
2010s American adult animated television series
2010s American LGBT-related comedy television series
2010s American sitcoms
American adult animated comedy television series
American animated sitcoms
American flash adult animated television series
English-language television shows
Fox Broadcasting Company original programming
Television series by 20th Century Fox Television
Television series by Fox Television Animation
2010s American LGBT-related animated television series
Animated television series about children
Animated television series about dysfunctional families
Television shows set in the United States
American LGBT-related sitcoms
Television series set in 1962
Television series by Chernin Entertainment